Didier de La Cour de La Vallée (1550 – 1623) was a Benedictine monk, responsible for the foundation of the reforming Congregation of St. Vanne in 1604.

Life
Didier de La Cour was born at Montzéville, Meuse, in December 1550, into an ancient noble family of Lorraine but one which had grown so poor that they were obliged to work on their own lands. At 18, he entered St. Vanne's Abbey in Verdun and later studied at the University of Pont-à-Mousson, where he became friendly with Servais de Lairuelz and Saint Pierre Fourier.

La Cour became prior of St. Vanne's Abbey. He wished to apply the Rule of St. Benedict in its original rigour, but met with some resistance from the other monks. However, he had the support of Eric of Lorraine, Bishop of Verdun, and commendatory abbot of St Vanne. Despite the initial difficulties, his efforts ultimately met with success. Eric of Lorraine was also commendatory abbot of St Hidulf's in Moyenmoutier and the reforms were next introduced there. With the approval of Pope Clement VIII, the Congregation of St. Vanne and St. Hydulphe was formally established in 1604.

Jean Regnault, abbot of St. Augustine's in Limoges, adopted La Cour's reforms in 1613. This was followed by the Abbey of St. Faron near Meaux, St. Julien's at Nouilly, and St. Peter's at Jumièges. In 1604, the Congregation of St. Vanne was formed, which brought together all the reformist monasteries of Lorraine.

By the time of Dom Didier's death in 1623, the congregation contained forty monasteries in three provinces, and had inspired the formation in France of the parallel reform movement of the Congregation of St. Maur.

References

Sources
 Michaux, Gérard, 1998: Dom Didier de La Cour et la réforme des Bénédictins de Saint-Vanne, in Les Prémontrés et la Lorraine XIIe - XVIIIe siècle, pp. 125–144 (XXIIIe colloque du Centre d'études et de recherches prémontrées, directed by Dominique-Marie Dauzet and Martine Plouvier). Beauchesne: Paris.

1550 births
1623 deaths
People from Meuse (department)
French Benedictines